Pseudotorellia is a genus of small sea snails with a transparent, more or less internal, shell, marine gastropod mollusks in the family Velutinidae. Because the shell is mostly internal, these snails resemble sea slugs in general appearance.

Species
Species in the genus Pseudotorellia include:

 Pseudotorellia fragilis Warén, 1989

References

Gastropod genera
Velutinidae